Aminatu (also Amina; died 1610) was a Hausa Muslim historical figure in the city-state Zazzau (now city of Zaria in Kaduna State), in what is now in the north-west region of Nigeria. She might have ruled in the mid-sixteenth century. A controversial figure whose existence has been questioned by some historians, her real biography has been somewhat obscured by subsequent legends and folk tales.

Early life
Amina was born in the middle of the sixteenth century CE to King Nikatau, the 22nd ruler of Zazzau, and Queen Bakwa Turunku (r. 1536–). She had a younger sister named Zaria for whom the modern city of Zaria (Kaduna State) was renamed by the British in the early twentieth century. According to oral legends collected by anthropologist David E. Jones, Amina grew up in her grandfather's court and was favored by him. He carried her around court and instructed her carefully in political and military matters.

At age sixteen, Amina was named Magajiya (heir apparent), and was given forty female slaves (kuyanga). From an early age, Amina had a number of suitors attempt to marry her. Attempts to gain her hand included "a daily offer of ten slaves" from Makama and "fifty male slaves and fifty female slaves as well as fifty bags of white and blue cloth" from the Sarkin Kano.

After the death of her parents in or around 1566, Amina's brother became king of Zazzau. At this point, Amina had distinguished herself as a "leading warrior in her brother's cavalry" and gained notoriety for her military skills. She is still celebrated today in traditional Hausa praise songs as "Amina daughter of Nikatau, a woman as capable as a man that was able to lead men to war."

Queenship and expansion of Zazzau 
After the death of her brother Karami in 1576, Amina ascended to the position of queen. Zazzau was one of the original seven Hausa States (Hausa Bakwai), the others being Daura, Kano, Gobir, Katsina, Rano, and Garun Gabas. Before Amina assumed the throne, Zazzau was one of the largest of these states. It was also the primary source of slaves that would be sold at the slave markets of Kano and Katsina by Arab merchants.

Only three months after being crowned queen, Amina waged a 34-year campaign against her neighbors, to expand Zazzau territory. Her army, consisting of 20,000 foot soldiers and 1,000 cavalry troops, was well trained and fearsome. In fact, one of her first announcements to her people was a call for them to "resharpen their weapons." She conquered large tracts of land as far as Kwararafa and Nupe.

Legends cited by Sidney John Hogben say that she took a new lover in every town she went through, each of whom was said to meet the same unfortunate fate in the morning: "her brief bridegroom was beheaded so that none should live to tell the tale." Under Amina, Zazzau controlled more territory than ever before. To mark and protect her new lands, Amina had her cities surrounded by earthen walls.

Death 
The exact circumstances of Amina's death are not known. The nineteenth-century Muslim scholar Dan Tafa says that "She died in a place called Attaagar. It was for this reason that the kingdom of Zazzau was the most extensive among the kingdoms of Hausa, since Bauchi included many regions." Drawing on Tafa's account, Sidney John Hogben reports that "Amina died in Atagara, near present day Idah, for at that time Amina had pushed the frontiers of Zazzau south of the Niger-Benue confluence. But there are many contradictions surrounding her death; many authors in their books cited that she died in Vom Jos while other historian said she died in Atagara, the present day Idah."

Legacy 
As the British historian Michael Crowder has noted, after Amina's deathAlthough Amina's success as a ruler did not have a trickle down effect on her female successors, Amina enjoyed a lasting reputation, bordering on legend, as a woman warrior. Sultan Bello of Sokoto wrote:Beyond her expansion of Zazzau territory, she created trade routes throughout Northern Africa. Additionally, Amina has been credited with ordering the construction of a distinctive series of ancient Hausa fortifications, known as 'Amina's walls', and with introducing kola nut cultivation in the area.

Historical references 
One of the earliest sources to mention Amina is a map called the Planisphere of Domingos Teixeira, which was made in 1573 and names a place in Africa as "Castelo Damina," the Castle of Amina. One of the earliest textual sources to mention Amina is Muhammed Bello's history Ifaq al-Maysur, composed around 1836.  He claims that she was "the first to establish government among [the Hausa]," and she forced Katsina, Kano and other regions to pay tribute to her.  Bello provided no chronological details about her.  She is also mentioned in the Kano Chronicle, a well-regarded and detailed history of the city of Kano, composed in the late nineteenth century, but incorporating earlier documentary material.  According to this chronicle, she was a contemporary of Muhammad Dauda, who ruled from 1421 to 1438, and Amina conquered as far as Nupe and Kwarafa, collected tribute from far and wide and ruled for 34 years. A number of scholars accept this information and date her reign to the early to mid-fifteenth century.

There is also a local chronicle of Zaria itself, written largely the nineteenth century but extending to 1902, published in 1910, that gives a list of the rulers and the duration of their reigns. Amina is not mentioned in this chronicle, but oral tradition in the early twentieth century held her to be the daughter of Bakwa Turunku, whose reign is dated by the chronicle from 1492 to 1522. On this basis, some scholars date her reign to the early sixteenth century. Historian Abdullahi Smith, however, places her reign after 1576.

Modern cultural depictions

The Queen Amina Statue at the National Arts Theatre in Lagos State honors her, and multiple educational institutions bear her name.
Amina is the protagonist of the historical fantasy novel Queen of Zazzau (2018) by J.S. Emuakpor, based on her life beginning in 1557 CE.
Amina is the inspiration for the character Malika in the graphic novel Malika: Warrior Queen (2017) by Roye Okupe as stated in the coloring book also created by the author.
In  Education, the fifth episode of the Small Axe films by Steve McQueen, 12-year-old Kingsley Smith triumphantly reads aloud the story of Amina to his family, after having learnt to read.
In the video game Age of Empires III: Definitive Edition Queen Amina appears as the leader of the Hausa civilization.
Amina appears as the leader of Zazzau in 1444, well before her lifetime, in Europa Universalis IV. She is also a general, which female rulers typically cannot be in the game, and has very good stats.
The 2021 film Amina depicts her rise to the throne. It is directed by Izu Ojukwu.

More recent oral tradition has a series of lively stories about the queen, and these have found their way into popular culture. Among them were: Amina was a fierce warrior and loved fighting. As a child, her grandmother Marka, the favorite wife of her grandfather Sarkin Nohir, once caught her holding a dagger. Amina holding the dagger did not shock Marka, rather it was that Amina held it exactly as a warrior would. As an adult, she refused to marry for the fear of losing power. She helped Zazzau (Zaria) become the center of trade and to gain more land. Her mother, Bakwa, died when Amina was 36 years old, leaving her to rule over Zaria.

Partial family tree

See also
 History of Africa
 Legends of Africa
 Nigeria

References

1530s births
1610s deaths
African women in war
Women in 16th-century warfare
Women in 17th-century warfare
Nigerian royalty
Queens regnant in Africa
People from Zaria
16th-century Nigerian women
17th-century Nigerian women
Hausa people
History of women in Nigeria
Nigerian princesses
African slave owners
16th-century women rulers
17th-century women rulers